Amino (written:  or  in katakana) is a Japanese surname. Notable people with the surname include:

, Japanese writer and translator
Leo Amino (1911–1989), American sculptor
, Japanese rugby union player and coach
, Japanese anime director
, Japanese basketball player
, Japanese Marxist historian

Japanese-language surnames